Alexander Ploner (born 10 July 1978 in Bruneck) is an alpine skier and police officer. He represented Italy at the 2010 Winter Olympics. In giant slalom, he posted the third time in the first run, bud did not finish the second run.

References

External links
 

1978 births
Living people
Sportspeople from Bruneck
Italian male alpine skiers
Olympic alpine skiers of Italy
Alpine skiers at the 2002 Winter Olympics
Alpine skiers at the 2010 Winter Olympics
Ladin people
Alpine skiers of Centro Sportivo Carabinieri
Italian alpine skiing coaches